The osphradium is a pigmented chemosensory epithelium patch in the mantle cavity present in six of the eight extant classes of molluscs (it is absent in the scaphopoda and monoplacophora; among cephalopoda, only the nautilus has what appears to be a set of osphradia), on or adjacent to the ctenidia (gills). The main function of this organ is disputed but it is believed to be used to test incoming water for silt and possible food particles or, in some species, for sensing the presence of light.

It is a popular idea among malacologists that the presence of an osphradium should be a molluscan synapomorphy. However, an osphradium is absent in monoplacophorans and scaphopods.  Moreover, the differences in enervation of these patches suggest that the osphradium (as a patch enervated from the ctenidial nerve) may be different from another organ sometimes called the posterior sensory organ (PSO) with separate enervation from the  lateral nerve cords.  Both types of sensory organs are found in the nautilus.

References

External links 
 Hulbert G. C. E. B. & Yonge C. M. (1937). "A Possible Function of the Osphradium in the Gastropoda". Nature 139: 840-841. .
 Brown A. C. & Noble R. G. (1960). "Function of the Osphradium in Bullia (Gastropoda)". Nature 188: 1045-1045. .

Cephalopod zootomy
Gastropod anatomy